Yoximar Granados Mosquera (born March 31, 1992) is a Colombian footballer for the Colombian club Llaneros.

Career
Granado is a product CDEF Carlos Sarmiento Lora, and spent time training with Argentine First Division side Quilmes in 2010 as a youth.

After trialing with Major League Soccer's Chicago Fire in the spring of 2011 Granado signed with the Fort Lauderdale Strikers in the North American Soccer League on April 14, 2011.

He made his debut for Fort Lauderdale the very next day, on April 15, as a late substitute in a game against the NSC Minnesota Stars.

References

External links
 Fort Lauderdale bio

1992 births
Living people
Colombian footballers
Fort Lauderdale Strikers players
Llaneros F.C. players
Colombian expatriate footballers
Expatriate soccer players in the United States
North American Soccer League players
Association football midfielders
Footballers from Cali